Golden Record is the third studio album by American alternative rock band The Dangerous Summer, scheduled for release on August 6, 2013 through Hopeless Records. The band performed as part of Warped Tour Australia in November and December.

Critical reception

The album has been generally well received by critics, with AbsolutePunk, Alter the Press and Rock Sound giving positive reviews. Alternative Press reviewer Evan Lucy gave a mixed review, stating that the album is "a shame, because when they're on, the Dangerous Summer can be a wrecking-ball force."

Track listing

Deluxe version

References

External links 
 New Album on Hopeless Records 

2013 albums
The Dangerous Summer albums
Hopeless Records albums